Marcy is an unincorporated community and census-designated place (CDP) in the town of Marcy, Oneida County, New York, United States. It was first listed as a CDP prior to the 2020 census.

The CDP is in eastern Oneida County, in the southern part of the town of Marcy. The hamlet of Maynard is in the eastern part of the CDP. Interstate 90, the New York Thruway, passes through Marcy, but with no direct access. New York State Route 49, the Utica–Rome Expressway, runs the length of the community, with access from one exit in the center of the CDP, as well as exits at the eastern and western ends of the CDP. The Erie Canal forms the southern border of the community.

Demographics

References 

Census-designated places in Oneida County, New York
Census-designated places in New York (state)